Skalnaté pleso (1751m) is a lake located in the High Tatras mountains in the north of Slovakia.

The highest wind speed ever recorded in Slovakia was recorded here on 29 November 1965, when a wind with the speed of 78,6 m/s (283 km/h) was recorded.

In November 2021, there was a rare occurrence, as Pleso dried out entirely. This was the result of a dry period, as it is filled solely by precipitation, and continued evaporation. The lake has refilled since.

References

Lakes of Slovakia